Louis Alexandre Conrad "Buck" Grant (October 2, 1894 – February 12, 1982) was a Canadian professional ice hockey player. He played in the Western Canada Hockey League with the Saskatoon Sheiks (1921–22 season) and Edmonton Eskimos (1921–22 season to 1922–23 season). He was a left winger. Grant also played with the Coleman Tigers in Coleman, Alberta.

References

External links

1894 births
1982 deaths
Edmonton Eskimos (ice hockey) players
Ice hockey people from Manitoba
Saskatoon Sheiks players
Canadian ice hockey left wingers